Trépillots is an industrial park located in Besançon, Doubs, France.

History 
Trépillots is the name of three related industrial parks: Tilleroyes, Châteaufarine and Trépillots. Formerly, the industrial park of Châteaufarine was called "Planoise Industrial Park" and was an extension of the area containing the neighborhood businesses.  Today, the sector is a part of the Tilleroyes, and is located at the south of the area. A lot of businesses reside in Trépillots, as well as the municipality's slaughterhouse and waste disposal.

See also 
 Planoise
 Industrial park 
 Besançon

Planoise
Areas of Besançon